Thady Ó Cianáin (or Thady Keenan) was an Irish composer of the early 17th century.

A member of the Ó Cianáin family, he is famous as the composer of the tune "An Tighearna Mhaigheo"/"Lord Mayo". However, Captain Francis O'Neill credited one David Murphy as its composer.

References

 The Learned Family of Ó Cianáin/Keenan, by Nollaig Ó Muraíle, in Clogher Record, pp. 396–402, 2005.

External links
 http://billhaneman.ie/IMM/IMM-V.html

Composers from Northern Ireland
Musicians from County Fermanagh
17th-century Irish people
Harpists from Northern Ireland
Year of birth missing
Year of death missing